WMJW (107.5 FM) is a radio station licensed to the city of Rosedale, Mississippi; it has a country music format known as "Majic 107.5" and is owned by Radio Cleveland located in Cleveland, Mississippi.

References

External links
Majic 107.5 Facebook
Radio Cleveland Facebook

MJW